The Comics Buyer's Guide (CBG) magazine administered the annual Comics Buyer's Guide Fan Awards from 1982 to circa 2010, with the first awards announced in issue #500 (June 17, 1983). 

Upon taking over as CBG editors, Don and Maggie Thompson aspired to bring back a series of comic book fan awards like the Goethe Awards, which they had administered in the first half of the 1970s. (The Goethe Award — later known as the Comic Fan Art Award — originated with the fanzine Newfangles and then shared close ties with The Buyer's Guide to Comics Fandom.) The format and balloting of the Fan Awards were in many ways derived from the Goethe Award/Comic Fan Art Award. The awards were initially voted on by CBG subscribers; the voting was later opened up to everyone. As many as 5,000 votes were cast per year during the 1990s.

The awards were often presented at the annual Chicago Comicon until 1996 (when the Wizard Fan Awards moved in); from that point forward the CBG Award results were simply published in the magazine.

As of 2006, awards were presented in 12 categories.

Past winners 
Dates for awards are slightly confusing, as explained by the Comic Book Awards Almanac:

Alex Ross won the CBG Award for Favorite Painter seven years in a row, resulting in that publication's retirement of that category in 2001. Comics Buyer's Guide Senior Editor Maggie Thompson later commented in regard to this, "Ross may simply be the field's Favorite Painter, period. That's despite the fact that many outstanding painters are at work in today's comic books."

The following are past winners (where the information is available):

Favorite Publisher 
 1997 DC Comics
 1998 DC
 1999 DC
 2000 DC
 2001 DC
 2002 DC
 2003 DC
 2004 DC
 2005 DC
 2006 Marvel Comics
 2008 DC

Favorite Editor 
 1982 (tie)
 Al Milgrom 
 Len Wein
 1983 Mike Gold
 1984 Jim Shooter
 1985 Marv Wolfman
 1986 Dennis O'Neil
 1987 Mark Gruenwald
 1988 Dennis O'Neil
 1989 Dennis O'Neil
 1990 Bob Harras
 1991 Bob Harras
 1992 Karen Berger
 1993 Mike Carlin
 1994 Mike Carlin
 1995 Bob Harras
 1996 (tie)
 Mark Gruenwald 
 Dennis O'Neil
 1997 Archie Goodwin
 1998 Tom Brevoort
 1999 Dennis O'Neil
 2000 Joe Quesada
 2001 Joe Quesada
 2002 Axel Alonso
 2003 Axel Alonso
 2004 Tom Brevoort
 2005 Dan DiDio
 2006 Joe Quesada

Favorite Writer 
 1982 Frank Miller
 1983 (tie)
 Chris Claremont 
 Dave Sim
 1984 Chris Claremont
 1985 Alan Moore
 1986 Alan Moore
 1987 Alan Moore
 1988 Chris Claremont
 1989 Chris Claremont
 1990 Chris Claremont
 1991 Neil Gaiman
 1992 Neil Gaiman
 1993 Neil Gaiman
 1994 Peter David
 1995 Carl Barks
 1996 Mark Waid
 1997 Kurt Busiek
 1998 Kurt Busiek
 1999 Alan Moore
 2000 Alan Moore
 2001 Brian Michael Bendis
 2002 Brian Michael Bendis
 2003 Brian Michael Bendis
 2004 Geoff Johns
 2005 Geoff Johns
 2006 Stan Lee
 2007 Geoff Johns
 2008 Geoff Johns

Favorite Artist/Penciller 
 1982 Frank Miller
 1983 George Pérez
 1984 John Byrne
 1985 George Pérez
 1986 John Byrne
 1987 George Pérez
 1988 Todd McFarlane
 1989 Todd McFarlane
 1990 Jim Lee
 1991 Jim Lee
 1992 Todd McFarlane
 1993 Todd McFarlane
 1994 Todd McFarlane
 1995 William Van Horn
 1996 John Byrne
 1997 George Pérez
 1998 George Pérez
 1999 George Pérez
 2000 George Pérez
 2001 John Romita Jr.
 2002 George Pérez
 2003 George Pérez
 2004 Jim Lee
 2005 George Pérez
 2006 George Pérez
 2008 George Pérez

Favorite Fan Artist 
 1982 Fred Hembeck
 1983 Fred Hembeck
 1984 Fred Hembeck

Favorite Inker 
 1986 Terry Austin
 1987 Terry Austin
 1988 Terry Austin
 1989 Terry Austin
 1990 Scott Williams
 1991 Scott Williams
 1992 Scott Williams
 1993 Scott Williams
 1994 Scott Williams
 1995 Pat Block
 1996 Terry Austin
 1997 Terry Austin
 1998 Al Vey
 1999 Al Vey
 2000 Al Vey
 2001 Tom Palmer
 2002 Jimmy Palmiotti
 2003 Scott Williams
 2004 Scott Williams
 2005 Terry Austin
 2006 Scott Williams

Favorite Letterer 
 1986 John Costanza
 1987 John Costanza
 1988 Tom Orzechowski
 1989 Rick Parker
 1990 Rick Parker
 1991 Tom Orzechowski
 1992 Tom Orzechowski
 1993 Tom Orzechowski
 1994 Todd Klein
 1995 William Van Horn
 1996 Richard Starkings and Comicraft
 1997 Richard Starkings and Comicraft
 1998 Richard Starkings and Comicraft
 1999 Todd Klein
 2000 Todd Klein
 2001 Todd Klein
 2002 (tie)
 Todd Klein
 Richard Starkings and Comicraft (tie)
 2003 Richard Starkings and Comicraft
 2004 Richard Starkings and Comicraft
 2005 John Workman
 2006 Jeff Eckleberry
 2009 Todd Klein
 2010 Todd Klein

Favorite Colorist 
 1986 Lynn Varley
 1987 Glynis Oliver
 1988 Glynis Oliver
 1989 Glynis Oliver
 1990 Gregory Wright
 1991 Joe Rosas
 1992 Steve Oliff
 1993 Steve Oliff & Olyoptics
 1994 Steve Oliff & Olyoptics
 1995 Tom McCraw
 1996 Gregory Wright
 1997 Lovern Kindzierski
 1998 Lynn Varley
 1999 Lynn Varley
 2000 Laura Depuy
 2001 Laura Depuy
 2002 Laura Depuy Martin
 2003 Laura Depuy Martin
 2004 Laura Depuy Martin
 2005 Laura Martin
 2006 Eva Hopkins

Favorite Comic Book 
 1982 The Uncanny X-Men (Marvel)
 1983 American Flagg! (First)
 1984 The Uncanny X-Men (Marvel)
 1985 Swamp Thing (DC)
 1986 Swamp Thing (DC)
 1987 Justice League International (DC)
 1988 The Uncanny X-Men (Marvel)
 1989 The Uncanny X-Men (Marvel)
 1990 The Uncanny X-Men (Marvel)
 1991 X-Men (Marvel)
 1992 The Sandman (DC)
 1993 The Sandman (DC/Vertigo)
 1994 The Sandman (DC/Vertigo)
 1995 Uncle Scrooge Adventures (Gladstone)
 1996 Kurt Busiek's Astro City (Homage)
 1997 Kurt Busiek's Astro City (Homage)
 1998 Avengers (Marvel)
 1999 Avengers Forever (Marvel)
 2000 Starman (DC)
 2001 JSA (DC)
 2002 JSA (DC)
 2003 JSA (DC)
 2004 JSA (DC)
 2005 Infinite Crisis (DC)
 2006 The Amazing Spider-Man (Marvel)

Favorite Original Graphic Novel/Album 
 1984 Dazzler: The Movie (Marvel Graphic Novel #12) (Marvel)
 1985 The Comic Book Price Guide #15 (Overstreet)
 1986 Daredevil: Love and War (Marvel Graphic Novel #24) (Marvel)
 1987 Batman: Son of the Demon (DC)
 1988 Batman: The Killing Joke (DC)
 1989 Batman: Arkham Asylum (DC)
 1990 Elektra Lives Again (Marvel)
 1991 Batman/Judge Dredd: Judgment on Gotham (DC & Egmont Fleetway)
 1992 Star Trek: Debt of Honor (DC)
 1993 Superman: Speeding Bullets (DC)
 1994 The Power of Shazam! (DC)
 1995 Sandman Midnight Theatre (DC/Vertigo)
 1996 Batman/Captain America (DC/Marvel)
 1997 Sin City: Family Values (Dark Horse)
 1998 The New Adventures of Abraham Lincoln (Image)
 1999 Batman: War on Crime (DC)
 2000 Shazam! Power of Hope (DC)
 2001 Wonder Woman: Spirit of Truth (DC)
 2002 JLA/JSA: Family Values (DC)
 2003 The Sandman: Endless Nights (DC/Vertigo)
 2004 The Originals (DC/Vertigo)
 2005 Top 10: The Forty-Niners (DC/ABC)
 2006 The Dreamland Chronicles (Blue Dream Studios)
 2009 Tales of the Starlight Drive-In (Image)

Favorite Reprint Graphic Novel/Album 
 1987 Watchmen (DC)
 1988 Batman: Year One (DC)
 1989 X-Men: Days of Future Past (Marvel)
 1990 Batman Archives Vol. 1 (DC)
 1991 The Sandman: Preludes & Nocturnes (DC)
 1992 Sin City (Dark Horse)
 1993 The Death of Superman (DC)
 1994 Marvels (Marvel)
 1995 Carl Barks Library (Gladstone)
 1996 Kurt Busiek's Astro City: Life in the Big City (Image/WildStorm/Homage)
 1997 Kingdom Come (DC)
 1998 Plastic Man Archives, vol. 1 (DC)
 1999 (tie)
 Manhunter: The Special Edition (DC) 
 300 (Dark Horse) (tie)
 1999 From Hell (Eddie Campbell) (tie)
 2000 Spirit Archives (DC)

Favorite Limited Series 
 1985 Crisis on Infinite Earths, by Marv Wolfman (DC)
 1986 Batman: The Dark Knight, by Frank Miller (DC)
 1987 Watchmen, by Alan Moore (DC)
 1988 Batman: The Cult (DC)
 1989 Hawkworld (DC)
 1990 Lobo (DC)
 1991 The Infinity Gauntlet (Marvel)
 1992 WildC.A.T.S. (Image)
 1993 (tie)
 Daredevil: Man Without Fear (Marvel) 
 Death: The High Cost of Living (DC/Vertigo) (tie)
 1994 Marvels (Marvel)
 1995 Sin City: The Big Fat Kill (Dark Horse)
 1996 Kingdom Come (DC)
 1997 Batman: The Long Halloween (DC)
 1998 Superman for All Seasons (DC)
 1999 Avengers Forever (Marvel)
 2000 Punisher (Marvel)

Favorite Painter 
 1991 Simon Bisley
 1992 Joe Jusko
 1993 Joe Jusko
 1994 Alex Ross
 1995 Alex Ross
 1996 Alex Ross
 1997 Alex Ross
 1998 Alex Ross
 1999 Alex Ross
 2000 Alex Ross

Favorite Character 
 1982 Wolverine
 1983 (tie)
 Batman
 Cerebus
 Reuben Flagg
 1984 Wolverine
 1985 Batman
 1986 Batman
 1987 Batman
 1988 Batman
 1989 Spider-Man
 1990 Spider-Man
 1991 Spider-Man
 1992 Spawn
 1993 Batman
 1994 Batman
 1995 Donald's Nephews (Huey, Dewey, and Louie)
 1996 Batman
 1997 Batman
 1998 Batman
 1999 Batman
 2000 Batman
 2001 Spider-Man
 2002 Batman
 2003 Batman
 2004 Batman
 2005 Batman
 2006 (tie)
 Batman
 Spider-Man (tie)
 2008 Batman

Favorite Cover Artist 
 1985 George Pérez
 1986 George Pérez
 1987 George Pérez
 1988 Todd McFarlane
 1989 Todd McFarlane
 1990 Todd McFarlane
 1991 Jim Lee
 1992 Brian Bolland
 1993 Brian Bolland
 1994 Brian Bolland
 1995 Alex Ross
 1996 Alex Ross
 1997 Alex Ross
 1998 Alex Ross
 1999 Alex Ross
 2000 Alex Ross
 2001 Alex Ross
 2002 Alex Ross
 2003 Alex Ross
 2004 Alex Ross
 2005 Alex Ross
 2006 Scott Christian Sava

Favorite Comic-Book Story 
 1982 "Last Hand", Daredevil #181 (Marvel)
 1983 (tie)
 "Doom!", Thor #337 (Marvel)
 "Hard Times", American Flagg! #1-3 (First)
 1984 "The Judas Contract", Tales of the Teen Titans #42-44 (DC)
 1985 "Beyond the Silent Night", Crisis on Infinite Earths #7 (DC)
 1986 "Batman: The Dark Knight", Batman: The Dark Knight #1-4 (DC)
 1987 Watchmen (DC)
 1988 "A Death in the Family", Batman #426-429 (DC)
 1989 "A Lonely Place of Dying", Batman #440-442 & The New Titans #60-61 (DC)
 1990 "X-Tinction Agenda", the X-Men titles (Marvel)
 1991 "Season of Mists", The Sandman #21-28 (DC)
 1992 "The Death of Superman", the Superman titles (DC)
 1993 "Reign of the Supermen", the Superman titles (DC)
 1994 "The Kindly Ones", The Sandman #57-69 (DC)
 1995 "Horsing Around with History", Uncle Scrooge Adventures #33 (Gladstone)
 1996 "Kingdom Come", Kingdom Come #1-4 (DC)
 1997 "Confession", Kurt Busiek's Astro City #5-9 (Image)
 1998 "Superman for All Seasons", Superman for All Seasons #1-4 (DC)
 1999 "No Man's Land", Batman titles (DC)
 2000 "Grand Guignol", Starman #62-72 (DC)
 2001 Amazing Spider-Man #36 (Marvel)
 2002 (tie)
 "Super-Human", Ultimates #1-6 (Marvel) 
 The League of Extraordinary Gentlemen Vol. 2 #1-3 (DC/ABC) (tie)
 2003 "Hush", Batman #609-619 (DC)
 2004 "Identity Crisis", Identity Crisis #1-5 (DC)
 2005 "Infinite Crisis", Infinite Crisis #1 (DC)
 2006 "Happily Ever After", Fables #50 (DC)

Favorite Direct-Sales Only Title (Phil Seuling Award) 
 198? [book title?], by Marv Wolfman
 1986 Watchmen, by Alan Moore

Favorite Publication About Comics 
 1982 The Comic Reader (Street)
 1983 The Comic Reader (Street)
 1984 Amazing Heroes (Fantagraphics)
 1985 Amazing Heroes (Fantagraphics)
 1986 Amazing Heroes (Fantagraphics)
 1987 Amazing Heroes (Fantagraphics)
 1988 Marvel Age (Marvel)
 1989 Marvel Age (Marvel)
 1990 Marvel Age (Marvel)
 1991 Wizard (Wizard)
 1992 Wizard (Wizard)
 1993 Wizard (Wizard)
 1994 Wizard (Wizard)

See also 
 Comics Buyer's Guide
 List of comics awards

References

Comics awards